Stefan Hristov (born 28 August 1989) is a Bulgarian professional footballer who plays as a forward for Bulgarian Second League club Spartak Pleven.

Career
In January 2014, Hristov joined Lyubimets 2007. He made his A Group debut in a 0–2 home loss against Lokomotiv Plovdiv on 22 February.

In June 2014, Hristov signed with Spartak Pleven. He scored five goals at Pleven Stadium in a 7–0 thrashing of Sitomir Nikopol on 16 November 2014. He made 23 appearances during the 2014–15 season finishing as the club's top scorer with 29 goals in third division and helped his team to gain promotion in the B Group.

On 8 January 2016 Boncho Genchev announced that Hristov is joining Etar Veliko Tarnovo, to help them promote to  B Group.

On 30 December 2016, Hristov signed with Vitosha Bistritsa.

On 14 June 2019, Stefan Hristov signed with Dunav Ruse a 2 years contract.

References

External links

1989 births
Living people
Bulgarian footballers
First Professional Football League (Bulgaria) players
PFC Spartak Pleven players
FC Lyubimets players
SFC Etar Veliko Tarnovo players
FC Vitosha Bistritsa players
FC Dunav Ruse players
FC Tsarsko Selo Sofia players
FC Krumovgrad players
Association football forwards
Sportspeople from Pleven